General elections were held in Tokelau on 23 January 2020.

Electoral system
The General Fono consists of a Faipule (representative) and a Pulenuku (village mayor) elected in each of the three villages (Atafu, Fakaofo and Nukunonu). Each village also elects one delegate for every 100 residents. All elections in Atafu and Fakaofo took place under a two-round system, where if no candidate obtains over 50% of the vote, the top two move on to a runoff election to decide the winner. If there were multiple delegates elected in a village, majority-at-large voting was used. Nukunonu elections took place under traditional rules, where election arrangements were managed and conducted autonomously according to each village Taupulega.

Results

References

Tokelau
Elections in Tokelau
General